The Palestinian Central Council (PCC), also known as PLO Central Council, is one of the institutions of the Palestine Liberation Organization (PLO). The PCC makes policy decisions when the Palestinian National Council (PNC) is not in session. The PCC is acting as a link between the PNC and the PLO Executive Committee. The PCC is elected by the PNC after nomination by the PLO Executive, and chaired by the PNC president.

Members

The membership has risen from 42 (1976), 55 (1977), 72 (1984), 107 (early 90s), 95 (mid-90s) to 124 (1996). As of April 1996, the PCC consisted of 124 members from the PLO Executive Committee, PNC, PLC and other Palestinian organizations.

History

On 5 January 2013, it was announced that the PLO had delegated the duties of the  Palestinian Authority’s government and parliament to the Central Council.

References

Palestinian Central Council